Broad Bay (Scottish Gaelic: Loch a Tuath, meaning "north loch") is a bay which is situated on the coast of Isle of Lewis, and separates Back and Point.

Isle of Lewis